The R311 road is a regional road in west central County Mayo in Ireland.

The government legislation that defines the R311, the Roads Act 1993 (Classification of Regional Roads) Order 2012 (Statutory Instrument 54 of 2012), provides the following official description:

Castlebar — Newport, County Mayo

Between its junction with R310 at Ellison Street in the town of Castlebar and its junction with N59 at Main Street Newport in the county of Mayo via Duke Street, Market Square (and via Shambles Street), Newtown, Newport Road and Snugborough in the town of Castlebar: Derrycoosh, Logjody Bridge, Cuilmore; and Castlebar Road at Newport in the county of Mayo.

See also
List of roads of County Mayo
National primary road
National secondary road
Regional road
Roads in Ireland

References

Regional roads in the Republic of Ireland
Roads in County Mayo